Urosaurus gadovi is a species of lizard. The common name for this species is the Gadow's tree lizard. Its range is in Mexico.

References 

Urosaurus
Reptiles of Mexico
Reptiles described in 1921
Taxa named by Karl Patterson Schmidt